HECW may refer to:

HECW, the ICAO code for Cairo West Air Base in Cairo, Egypt
HECW1, a human gene
HECW2, a human gene